Ian Rankin is a Scottish former rugby union player and now coach. He is also a former President of the Scottish Rugby Union. He has coached various clubs, among them:- Caledonia Reds, Edinburgh Rugby, Scotland 'A', Scotland U21, Scotland Club XV and Dundee HSFP.

Rugby Union career

Amateur career

He played for Edinburgh Wanderers and Howe of Fife.

He won the Howe of Fife Sevens while with the Cupar club.

Coaching career

He began his coaching career at Kirkcaldy before coaching the North and Midlands district side. On professionalism this side became Caledonia Reds and Rankin coached the professional side. He led the Caledonia Reds to their first ever outright Scottish Inter-District Championship title - as the amateur or professional side -  in 1996-97.

When the Reds side was disbanded in 1998, Rankin moved to coach Edinburgh Rugby.

He had various stints at Scotland coaching posts including Scotland 'A', Scotland U21 and Scotland Club XV.

He took over coaching at Dundee HSFP from the All Black player Jason Hewett.

Administrative career

He became the 125th President of the Scottish Rugby Union. He served the standard one year from 2014 to 2015.

References 

Rugby union people in Scotland
Scottish rugby union players
Presidents of the Scottish Rugby Union